2011–12 Syed Mushtaq Ali Trophy was the fourth edition of the Syed Mushtaq Ali Trophy competition, an Indian domestic team only Twenty20 cricket tournament in India. It was contested by 27 teams. Baroda emerged as winners of the tournament.

Group stage

East Zone

South Zone

North Zone

Central Zone

West Zone

 Knockout stage (S)''' - Baroda qualified for Quarter-finals by winning the Super Over against Karnataka after the Pre-quarter-finals ended in a tie.

Final

References

External links
 Series home at ESPN Cricinfo
 Squads

Syed Mushtaq Ali Trophy
Syed Mushtaq Ali Trophy